Presidential elections were held in Algeria on 22 December 1988. Incumbent President Chadli Bendjedid, leader of the National Liberation Front (the country's sole legal political party), was re-elected unopposed with 93% of the vote, based on an 89% turnout.

Results

References

Algeria
1988 in Algeria
Presidential elections in Algeria
One-party elections
Single-candidate elections